Merideth Boswell is an American set decorator and production designer. She is best known for her work in the films Apollo 13 (1995) and How the Grinch Stole Christmas (2000), both of which earned her nominations for an Academy Award for Best Art Direction. Boswell was born in Little Rock, Arkansas. She graduated with a Bachelor of Arts in ceramics from the University of Arkansas.

Selected filmography

As set decorator
 He Said, She Said (1991)
 Zandalee (1991)
 The Gun in Betty Lou's Handbag (1992)
 Natural Born Killers (1994)
 The Scout (1994)
 Apollo 13 (1995)
 Nixon (1995)
 That Thing You Do! (1996)
 U Turn (1997)
 Mighty Joe Young (1998)
 EDtv (1999)
 How the Grinch Stole Christmas (2000)
 Bandits (2001)
 How Do You Know (2010)

As production designer
 The Three Burials of Melquiades Estrada (2005)
 In the Electric Mist (2009)
 The Sunset Limited (2011)
 The Last Exorcism Part II (2013)
 The Homesman (2014)
 I Saw the Light (2015)

Awards and nominations

Academy Awards

References

External links
 

Living people
American set decorators
American production designers
Artists from Little Rock, Arkansas
University of Arkansas alumni
Year of birth missing (living people)
Women production designers